Trnjane may refer to the following villages in Serbia:

 Trnjane (Aleksinac), municipality of Aleksinac
 Trnjane (Negotin), municipality of Negotin
 Trnjane (Požarevac), municipality of Požarevac
 Veliko Trnjane, municipality of Leskovac
 Gornje Trnjane, municipality of Leskovac
 Donje Trnjane, municipality of Leskovac

See also
 Trnjani (disambiguation)